Benjamin Howard Hibbard, Jr. (May 23, 1928 – October 29, 1984) was an American art historian and educator. Hibbard was Professor of Italian Baroque Art at Columbia University.

Career
A native of Madison, Hibbard was born to Margaret and Benjamin, Sr., an agricultural economics professor at the University of Wisconsin. Hibbard received both a Bachelor of Arts in philosophy and a Master of Arts in art history from the University of Wisconsin in 1949 and 1952, respectively. His master's thesis was on the Basilica of Notre-Dame du Port. Hibbard then continued on to Harvard University, where he earned a PhD in art history in 1958. His doctoral dissertation on the Palazzo Borghese in Rome. Hibbard also spent that year as a Fellow at the American Academy in Rome.

A year after graduating, Hibbard joined the faculty at Columbia University. In 1965, he was awarded a Guggenheim Fellowship, and in the following year, became a full professor. His title was Professor of Italian Baroque Art, a post that he held until his death in 1984. From 1978 to 1981, Hibbard was the chair of the art history department at Columbia. During the 1976-1977 academic year, he was named Slade Professor of Fine Art at the University of Oxford.

Hibbard was a scholar of such Italian artists and architects such as Gian Lorenzo Bernini, Caravaggio, Carlo Maderno, and Michelangelo, and has published extensively on related topics.

Personal life
Hibbard married Shirley Irene Griffith, with whom he had three daughters: Claire, Susan, and Carla. The family resided in Scarsdale. Hibbard died in 1984 from cancer, at the New York-Presbyterian Hospital.

Selected works
The Architecture of the Palazzo Borghese, American Academy in Rome, 1962
Essays in the History of Architecture Presented to Rudolf Wittkower, Phaidon,  1967
Bernini, Penguin Books, 1966
Carlo Maderno and Roman Architecture, 1580–1630, Pennsylvania State University Press, 1971
Michelangelo, Harper and Row, 1974
Masterpieces of Western Sculpture from Medieval to Modern, Harper and Row, 1977
The Metropolitan Museum of Art, Harper and Row, 1980
Caravaggio, Harper and Row, 1983

See also
List of Columbia University people
List of fellows of the American Academy in Rome (1896–1970)
List of Guggenheim Fellowships awarded in 1965
List of Harvard University people
List of people from Madison, Wisconsin
List of University of Wisconsin–Madison people in academics

References

External links
Dictionary of Art Historians profile
New York Times obituary

1928 births
1984 deaths
People from Madison, Wisconsin
University of Wisconsin–Madison alumni
Harvard Graduate School of Arts and Sciences alumni
American art historians
Columbia University faculty
Slade Professors of Fine Art (University of Oxford)
Deaths from cancer in New York (state)